1st Mechanised Brigade may refer to:
 1st Mechanised Brigade (France)
 1st Mechanized Brigade (Romania)
 1st Mechanised Brigade (United Kingdom)